Nikolay Dmitriyevich Mordvinov (15 February 1901 – 26 January 1966) was a Soviet and Russian stage and film actor and theater director. He appeared in nine films from 1936 to 1965. People's Artist of the USSR (1949).

Filmography

References

External links 

1901 births
1966 deaths
20th-century Russian male actors
Honored Artists of the RSFSR
People's Artists of the RSFSR
People's Artists of the USSR
Stalin Prize winners
Lenin Prize winners
Recipients of the Order of the Red Banner of Labour
Soviet male film actors

Soviet male stage actors
Soviet theatre directors
Spoken word artists
Burials at Novodevichy Cemetery